The discography of Japanese musician Kaela Kimura consists of eleven studio albums, two compilation albums, one cover album, three extended plays, twenty-eight singles and five video albums. She debuted as a musician in 2004 under the label Columbia Music Entertainment, releasing ten albums with the company. In 2013, Kimura released Rock, an album of English language covers under her private label Ela Music. In 2014, Kimura released "Ole! Oh!", her first single under Victor Entertainment.

Kimura was originally a member of the band Amino before making her solo debut. Two of the band's songs are present on the 2005 compilation album ... of Newtypes. In 2006, Kimura collaborated with the band Sadistic Mika Band as a temporary vocalist on three of their songs on their revival album Narkissos.

Her most commercially successful singles are "Rirura Riruha" (2005), "Butterfly" (2009) and "Ring a Ding Dong" (2010), all of which have been certified Million by the Recording Industry Association of Japan.

Studio albums
All release dates pertain to their release in Japan, unless stated.

Compilation albums

Cover album

Extended plays

Singles

As a lead artist

As a featured artist

Promotional singles

Video albums

Other appearances

Notes

References

Discographies of Japanese artists
Pop music discographies
Rock music discographies